The following is a list of Malayalam films released in 1998.

Dubbed films

 1989
1988
Malayalam
 Mal
1989 in Indian cinema